O'Charley's is a casual dining restaurant chain in the United States, with more than 175+ company-owned locations.  O'Charley's is located in 17 Southern and Midwestern states, including three joint venture O'Charley's restaurants in Louisiana.

O'Charley's was part of the parent company O'Charley's, Inc. Enterprise, a multi-concept restaurant company that operated or franchised a total of 363 restaurants under three brands: O'Charley's, Ninety Nine Restaurant, and Stoney River Legendary Steaks.  In 2012, O'Charley's, Inc. Enterprise was acquired by Fidelity National Financial and became part of American Blue Ribbon Holdings.

History

Charles (Sonny) Watkins founded O'Charley's restaurant in 1971 on 21st Avenue South in Nashville, across the street from Vanderbilt University.  Watkins ran O'Charley's from 1971 to 1984 when he sold the restaurant to David K. Wachtel. David K. Wachtel spent 23 years working for Shoney's where he eventually became president and chief executive officer of the restaurant company.  Wachtel resigned from Shoney's in 1982.  Wachtel intended to develop the O'Charley's restaurant into a restaurant chain.  In mid-1987, the 12th O'Charley's opened in Lexington, Kentucky, occupying a site formerly used by the Bennigan's chain of restaurants. While the Lexington grand opening was under way, Wachtel was working on plans to convert two more Bennigan's units in Huntsville, Alabama and Nashville, Tennessee into O'Charley's. 

In December 1993, Burns and McWhorter announced the formulation of a growth strategy designed to carry the 45-unit chain into the ranks of the country's largest regional dinner-house chains. In 1994, the company planned to open at least eight new O'Charley's restaurants, situating the new units primarily in southeastern markets such as Cookeville, Tennessee; Louisville and Paducah, Kentucky; and Palm Harbor, Florida. There was an expectation of restaurants opening for the year, but as time continued past 1994 other issues hindered this expansion. In February 1994, Wachtel resigned as chairman of O'Charley's, citing his "pressing commitments" with other business interests, the most notable of which was the 300-unit Western Sizzlin' budget steakhouse chain he had acquired in 1993. Burns was named chief executive and co-chairman and McWhorter was tapped as president and co-chairman. One month after Wachtel's resignation, the company was advised that four former O'Charley's employees had filed a federal lawsuit charging the restaurant chain with racial discrimination practices against African Americans in the company's hiring, assignment, and promotion procedures. Burns denied the charges 

In 2007, O'Charley's closed its Nashville commissary and distribution center, and began using Performance Food Group to distribute product to all of its locations. In 2013, O'Charley's launched "Free Pie Wednesday." Any dine-in customer ordering an entree on Wednesdays will receive a free slice of pie. In 2014 O'Charley's selected BOHAN Advertising as a marketing partner.

In April 2019, O'Charley's closed a single location in Florida. Three months later, O'Charley's abruptly closed eight locations in Indiana and Georgia in June 2019. The company had 201 locations in 2018, down from 213 in 2016.

Awards
Named to Forbes "200 Best Small Companies in America" list for the third consecutive year in 2002.
American Blue Ribbon Holdings was named by The Tennessean as a Top Workplace for 2014.

References

External links
 O'Charley's.com

Fidelity National Financial
Companies based in Nashville, Tennessee
Restaurants in Tennessee
Economy of the Midwestern United States
Economy of the Southeastern United States
Regional restaurant chains in the United States
Restaurants established in 1971
Companies formerly listed on the Nasdaq
1971 establishments in Tennessee